Megiddo (، ) is a kibbutz in northern Israel, built in 1949 on the site of the depopulated Arab village of Lajjun. Located in the Jezreel Valley, it falls under the jurisdiction of Megiddo Regional Council.

The kibbutz is located near Megiddo Junction, the intersection of highways 65 (from Hadera to Afula) and 66 (running from Haifa south to the West Bank). The junction is the site of a bus terminal and a high-security prison. 

In Christian apocalyptic literature, Mount Megiddo, the hill overlooking the valley where the current kibbutz is located, is identified as the site of the final battle between the forces of good and evil at the end of time, known as Armageddon and mentioned in the New Testament in Revelation 16:16.

Geography
The kibbutz is located near the site of the several Battles of Megiddo and Tel Megiddo, a rich archeological site. According to the Bible, the town was apportioned to the tribe of Manasseh. In 2005, Israeli archaeologists discovered the remains of an ancient church, perhaps the oldest in the Holy Land, under the grounds of the prison. Authorities are speculating about moving the prison so the site can be accessible to tourists.

History

Antiquity
Tel Megiddo is considered one of the most ancient settlements in the Middle East. It guarded the western branch of a narrow pass and trade route connecting Ancient Egypt and Assyria. The site was inhabited from approximately 7000 BCE to 586 BCE though the first significant remains date to the Chalcolithic period (4500–3500 BCE). However, the town experienced a decline in the Early Bronze-Age IV period (2300–2000 BCE), but the city was somewhat revived around 2000 BCE. Following massive construction, the town reached its largest size in the Middle Bronze Age, at 10–12 hectares. Though the city was subjugated by Thutmose III, it still prospered, and a massive and highly elaborate palace was constructed in the Late Bronze Age.

Iron Age (biblical era)
The city was destroyed around 1150 BCE, and the area was resettled by what some scholars have identified as early Israelites, before being replaced with an unwalled Philistine town. When the Israelites captured it, though, it became an important city, before being destroyed, possibly by Aramaean raiders, and rebuilt, this time as an administrative center for Tiglath-Pileser III's occupation of Samaria. However, its importance soon dwindled, and it was finally abandoned around 586 BCE. Since that time Megiddo has remained uninhabited, and surviving ruins pre-dating 586 BCE have had no new settlements to disturb the ruins. Since then, the town of Lajjun (not to be confused with the el-Lajjun archaeological site in Jordan) was built near the site, but without any new inhabitance or disturbance of its ruins.

First World War
The Battle of Megiddo was fought during World War I between Allied troops, led by General Edmund Allenby, and the defending Ottoman army near the site of the ancient ruin.

State of Israel 

The kibbutz was founded on 2 February 1949 by a gar'in of Holocaust survivors from Hungary and Poland who organized at the end of World War II and fought in the 1948 Arab–Israeli war. At first the members settled on the ruins of the Arab village al-Lajjun and several years later, relocated to a nearby hill. In 1952 a gar'in of migrants from Lebanon and Mexico joined the kibbutz. In 1959, another gar'in of migrants from Argentina and in the next years more gar'ins joined and youth organizations volunteered in the kibbutz, but the population did not grow as members left the kibbutz.

The kibbutz had problems developing demographically and economically. The number of residents remained low, with a high turnover of residents until the late 1990s. In November 2000, due to demographic problems and economic instability, members of the kibbutz decided to change the lifestyle and structure of the kibbutz in a way that every member is now responsible for his or her own livelihood and the kibbutz provides only some welfare services. Also, the members of the kibbutz decided to transfer the ownership of the housing units and businesses from the kibbutz to the residents.

In 2007, two new neighbourhoods were built on the western and northern parts of the kibbutz with 108 housing units.

Twin towns – sister cities
Megiddo is twinned with:
 Ixelles, Belgium
  Hita, Japan

See also
Legio

References

External links 
Megiddo Regional Council

Kibbutzim
Kibbutz Movement
Populated places established in 1949
Populated places in Northern District (Israel)
1949 establishments in Israel